The Renfrewshire Football League was a one-off Scottish Football competition played between March and September 1895. The intention was to have all the major Renfrewshire clubs competing. Arthurlie and Abercorn were invited but in the event only three clubs, all from the Scottish Football League, agreed to take part, meaning that only six matches took place.

League table

See also
 Defunct leagues in Scottish football

References

Defunct football leagues in Scotland
1895 establishments in Scotland
Sports leagues established in 1895
Sports leagues disestablished in 1895
1895 disestablishments in Scotland